Rudolf Těsnohlídek (7 June 1882 in Čáslav - 12 January 1928 in Brno) was a Czech writer, poet, journalist and translator. He also used the pseudonym Arnošt Bellis.

Life 
He attended secondary school (gymnasium) in Hradec Králové and later started to study Czech, history and French at university in Prague but didn't graduate.

Starting in 1908, he was a contributor to the Brno newspaper Lidové noviny. His serialized novel Liška Bystrouška (Vixen Sharp Ears), written to accompany a series of drawings by Stanislav Lolek, appeared in the Lidové noviny between 7 April and 23 June 1920, was published as a book in 1921, won a state prize and achieved lasting popularity. This optimistic tale, somewhere between a children's fairy tale and adult satire, was used as the basis for Leoš Janáček's opera The Cunning Little Vixen (Příhody Lišky Bystroušky, 1923).

Some of Těsnohlídek's other work reflects more pessimism and alienation than the lighthearted Vixen's tale.

His life, as interpreted by his journalistic colleague Bedřich Golombek, was a melodramatic tragedy imbued with pessimism, darkness, melancholy and decadence, a life plagued from childhood by feelings of sadness and social exclusion. In his teens, he watched helplessly as a friend drowned. When he was 21, he married Jindra Kopecká, a woman with tuberculosis. Two months after their wedding, on a holiday in Norway, she shot herself in the heart in front of him, possibly accidentally. Těsnohlídek was accused of murdering her, and had to endure two trials before being acquitted. In 1907 he moved to Brno, where he became a reporter of soudničky (cases from the local magistrate's court) for Lidové noviny. After he had met Janáček and discussed plans for the opera based on Liška Bystrouška, he married again, but this wife left him. He married a third time. He became interested in exploring the Moravian caves, wrote extensively about them, and submitted his drafts for publication but found they had been heavily edited without his knowledge. On 12 January 1928, he shot himself, as his first wife had done. His third wife gassed herself to death on hearing the news.

Vixen Sharp Ears was first published in English in 1985, as The Cunning Little Vixen, with pictures by Maurice Sendak.

Shortly before Christmas 1919, Těsnohlídek and some friends were walking in the woods outside the town of Bílovice nad Svitavou a few kilometres to the north of Brno when they discovered an abandoned girl, aged seventeen months, in danger of freezing. They rescued the child and took her to the police station at Bílovice. The child, subsequently named Liduška, was adopted by a family named Polákov from Brno, and lived until 1997, dying in Prague.

Adaptations 
Ursula Dubosarsky's 2018 novel for children, Brindabella, is based on Vixen Sharp Ears relocated in the Australian bush, with the role of the Vixen played by a kangaroo.

Work 
Nénie (1902) - poetry

Dva mezi ostatními (Two Among Others) (1906)

Květy v jíní (Flowers in Hoarfrost) (1908)

Poseidon (1916)

Liška Bystrouška (Vixen Sharp-ears, The Cunning Little Vixen) (1920)

Kolonia Kutejsík (1922, awarded a state prize)

Paví oko (Peacock's Eye) (1922)

Čimčirínek a chlapci (Čimčirínek and the Boys) (1922, stories for children)

Den (Day) (1923)

Vrba zelená (Green Willow) (1925)

Cvrček na cestách (Cricket on the move) (1927)

Surovost z něžnosti a jiné soudničky (The Brutality of Tenderness and Other soudničky) (a collection of his soudničky, published in 1982)

References 

 Bedřich Golombek: Rudolf Těsnohlídek. Prague: Orbis, 1946.
 Jaroslav Kunc: Slovník soudobých českých spisovatelů. Prague: Orbis, 1946.
 Bohuš Balajka: Přehledné dějiny české literatury II. Prague: Fortuna, 2005.

External links 
  Biography
 Article by Ursula Dubosarsky

1882 births
1928 suicides
Czech poets
Czech male poets
Suicides by firearm in Czechoslovakia
Suicides by firearm in the Czechoslovakia
20th-century Czech poets
20th-century male writers
People from Čáslav
Burials at Brno Central Cemetery
1928 deaths
Charles University alumni
Czechoslovak writers
Austro-Hungarian writers